Steve Goodheart is a retired American college baseball coach, who served as head coach of the Southern Arkansas Muleriders baseball team from 1981–2003. During his career he led SAU to a 764–406–5 record, making him the second winningest coach all-time among Arkansas college baseball coaches. Goodheart trails only retired University of Arkansas coach Norm DeBriyn's 1,161 wins.

Playing career
Goodheart came to SAU, then known as Southern State College, from Great Falls, MT and was a four-year letterwinner for the Muleriders. During his playing career at SAU, Goodheart was a part of two AIC Championship teams (1974 & 1975) and was an All-Conference player in 1975. Goodheart was an AIC All-Star in both 1975 and 1976.

Coaching career

College Assistant & High School Coaching Career
Following his playing career, Goodheart got his start as a student assistant coach at SAU for the 1977 season, during which Muleriders won their third AIC Championship in four years. After one year as a student assistant at SAU, Goodheart moved to Camden (Ark.) Fairview High School where he served as the head baseball coach during the 1978 season.  After one year at Camden Fairview, Goodheart moved to the University of Arizona to serve as a graduate assistant under National College Baseball Hall of Famer Jerry Kindall. During Goodheart's two seasons in Tucson, the Wildcats compiled an 88–46–1 record and won the 1980 College World Series title.

Southern Arkansas Muleriders
After the 1980 season, Goodheart was hired by his alma mater to replace Dr. Jack Harrington as the head coach of the Muleriders. Goodheart retired in 2003 as the winningest coach in school history.

Goodheart won 19 championships during his career at SAU.  As head coach, his Muleriders were AIC champions in 1983, 1986, 1987,  1988, 1989, 1990, 1991, 1992, 1994, and 1995.  Three of his SAU teams made appearances in the NAIA World Series (1983, 1987, 1991).  The 1987 team finished third in the World Series with a record of 46–7.  Goodheart's teams also won six district titles and 2 area titles. According to a press release when Goodheart was elected into the Southern Arkansas University Sports Hall of Fame:
“More than 50 of Goodheart’s former players have signed to play professional baseball.  He has coached 54 first-team All-AIC players, 26 first-team NAIA District 17 players, five NAIA All-Area players, 12 NAIA Southwest Region selections, 17 NAIA All-Americans, one NAIA Academic All-American, two Cliff Shaw Scholar-Athlete Award winners, 33 All-Gulf South Conference choices, 10 NCAA All-South Central Region selections, and two NCAA All-Americans.”  
Perhaps the most important accomplishment of Goodheart's career was overseeing SAU's transition from NAIA to the NCAA ranks.  Not only were Goodheart's teams able to make the jump, the teams proceeded to win at an even higher level.

Head coaching record

References

Living people
Southern Arkansas Muleriders baseball coaches
Southern Arkansas Muleriders baseball players
Year of birth missing (living people)